Pendleton is an unincorporated community in Northampton County, North Carolina, United States. The community is located on North Carolina Highway 35 between Conway to the south and Severn to the north. Pendleton has a post office with ZIP code 27862.

References

Unincorporated communities in Northampton County, North Carolina
Unincorporated communities in North Carolina